The Tłı̨chǫ All-Season Road (TASR), officially Northwest Territories Highway 9, is a  gravel road in Northwest Territories, Canada. The road connects the Tłı̨chǫ First Nations community of Whatì to the Yellowknife Highway with a permanent all-season road, while also improving winter road access to Gamètì and Wekweètì.

Description
Construction on the road began in August 2019. The contract to build the highway by 2022 and then maintain it for 25 years was projected to cost $411.8 million. The road opened to traffic on 30 November 2021.

References

External links
 Official site

Roads in the Northwest Territories
Roads within the Arctic Circle
Gravel roads
Public–private partnership projects in Canada
Transport infrastructure completed in 2021